Jörn Schwinkendorf (born 27 January 1971) is a German former professional footballer who played as a defender.

Playing his football at various sides in the lower division league in Germany, Schwinkendorf came to the attention of Cardiff City who paid £110,000 to SV Waldhof Mannheim for his services. However, despite his height he struggled to adapt to the physical nature of lower-tier English football and left the club later in the season after only playing a handful of games.

References

External links

1971 births
Living people
German footballers
Footballers from Hamburg
Association football defenders
English Football League players
FC St. Pauli players
Wuppertaler SV players
1. FC Saarbrücken players
Fortuna Düsseldorf players
VfB Lübeck players
SC Freiburg players
SV Waldhof Mannheim players
Cardiff City F.C. players
VfL Osnabrück players